Día D was an Argentine journalism TV program, aired by América TV. It was led by Jorge Lanata, Adolfo Castelo, Martín Caparrós, Reynaldo Sietecase, Andrés Klipphan, Maximiliano Montenegro, Andrea Rodríguez and Gisela Marziotta.

References

América TV original programming
1995 Argentine television series debuts
2003 Argentine television series endings